Streptomyces artemisiae is a bacterium species from the genus Streptomyces which has been isolated from the plant Artemisia annua in the Yunnan Province in China.

See also 
 List of Streptomyces species

References

Further reading

External links
Type strain of Streptomyces artemisiae at BacDive -  the Bacterial Diversity Metadatabase

artemisiae
Bacteria described in 2010